Clear Creek Township, Kansas may refer to one of the following places:

 Clear Creek Township, Ellsworth County, Kansas
 Clear Creek Township, Marion County, Kansas
 Clear Creek Township, Nemaha County, Kansas
 Clear Creek Township, Pottawatomie County, Kansas
 Clear Creek Township, Stafford County, Kansas

See also 
 List of Kansas townships
 Clear Creek Township (disambiguation)

Kansas township disambiguation pages